was a Japanese film director, actor, and screenwriter.

Career
Born as Takehiko Kagoshima in Nagasaki, Shima left for Tokyo after graduating from high school. He was in the first class of the Nihon Eiga Haiyū Gakkō and joined the Nikkatsu studio as an actor in 1925. Playing mostly romantic leads, he appeared in films directed by such masters as Tomu Uchida and Kenji Mizoguchi. He turned to directing in 1939, and quickly came to prominence with films such as Kaze no Matasaburō, an adaption of a Kenji Miyazawa story, and Jirō Monogatari. After the war, he directed such films as Ginza Kankan Musume and Jūdai no Seiten at Shintoho and Daiei Studios. He won a prize at the 1st Moscow International Film Festival for Unforgettable Trail. Some of his last films were made in Hong Kong for Shaw Brothers.

He directed over 90 films as a director and appeared in over 90 films as an actor. He was once married to the actress Yukiko Todoroki.

Selected filmography

Director 
 Kaze no Matasaburō (風の又三郎) (1940)
  (次郎物語) (1941)
 Ginza Kankan Musume (1949)
 Hibari no komoriuta (1951)
 The Phantom Horse (1955)
 Warning from Space (1956)
 Zangiku monogatari (1956)
 Unforgettable Trail (1959)

Actor
Jōnetsu no Shijin Takuboku (情熱の詩人啄木) (1936)
  (裸の町) (1937)

References

External links

1901 births
1986 deaths
Japanese film directors
Japanese male film actors
People from Nagasaki
20th-century Japanese male actors
20th-century Japanese screenwriters